Melva Lou Blancett (August 22, 1924 – March 2, 2010) was an American actress. Blancett was a founding member of both the local chapters of the Screen Actors Guild (SAG) and the American Federation of Television and Radio Artists (AFTRA) in the state of Arizona. She also served on the national boards of directors for both the AFTRA and SAG.

Blancett was born on August 22, 1924, in McAlester, Oklahoma. Her credits included roles in film, television movies, radio, television commercials and the theater. Her husband of 56 years, Lloyd Blancett, died in 1999. They had three sons, Lloyd Jr. and Jon, three grandchildren and one great-grandchild.

Melva Blancett died on March 2, 2010, at the age of 85.

References

External links

 

1924 births
2010 deaths
Actresses from Arizona
American television actresses
American stage actresses
People from Mesa, Arizona
People from McAlester, Oklahoma
21st-century American women